Liu Hua (896-May 31, 930), courtesy name Dexiu, formally Lady Minghui of Yan, known in Southern Han as Princess Qingyuan, was the first (known) wife of Wang Yanjun, who carried the title of Prince of Min during her lifetime and (after her death) claimed the title of emperor.  Her father was Liu Yin, the older brother of Southern Han's founding emperor Liu Yan (Emperor Gaozu).

Historical references in written accounts 
Very little was recorded about Liu Hua in traditional historical accounts — not even her name.  Her marriage to Wang Yanjun was noted as being in 917, but she was incorrectly described as the daughter of Liu Yan.  Her death date was not recorded, although she was described in the retrospective when Wang Yanjun, after declaring himself emperor, created an imperial consort, Chen Jinfeng, as empress in 935, implying that she was no longer alive at that point, and also described her as beautiful in contrast to the apparent ugly appearance that Empress Chen bore.  Another retrospective statement about her indicated that she carried the title of Princess Qingyuan in Southern Han.  Indeed, in the Spring and Autumn Annals of the Ten Kingdoms, her biography merely noted her princess title and the date of her marriage.  (The author of the Spring and Autumn Annals of the Ten Kingdoms, Wu Renchen, noted thereafter those facts, "There is already a biography for her under Southern Han," apparently forgetting that he did not write a biography for her under the Southern Han section.)

Tombstone 
Liu Hua's tombstone, discovered in 1965, however, provided additional information on her, including her name and courtesy name, as well as the identification of her father as Liu Yan's older brother Liu Yin rather than Liu Yan.  (Her princess title, as well as the emperor titles that her uncle claimed and posthumously honored her father with, were not referenced, as Min was then a vassal of Later Tang, which Southern Han was no longer a vassal of.)  She was described as Liu Yin's second daughter, and her mother was Lady Yan.  Her death date, but not birth date, was given, as was her age at death.

Lady Liu was described to have had four sons and two daughters — although it is unclear how many were actually her children, as Wang Yanjun's children by any other consort would have been legally considered her children as well.  (Indeed, as indicated below, as the second son, Wang Jipeng, consistently had a higher position throughout Wang Yanjun's reign, including as described on the tombstone, than the oldest son, Wang Jiyan, it might be an indicator that Wang Jipeng was her son while Wang Jiyan was born of a concubine.)  The sons were listed, in order, as Wang Jiyan, Wang Jipeng, Wang Jitao, and Wang Jigong.  The daughters were unnamed; one was described to be already of adult age, and one was described to be a child, at the time of her death.

Notes and references 

 Spring and Autumn Annals of the Ten Kingdoms, vol. 94.
 Zizhi Tongjian, vols. 270, 279

896 births
930 deaths
Southern Han people born during Tang
Five Dynasties and Ten Kingdoms princesses
Min Kingdom people
People from Guangdong
Min posthumous empresses